For the Record: The First 10 Years is a compilation album by David Allan Coe.

Track listing 

"You Never Even Called Me by My Name" - 5:14
"Please Come to Boston" - 4:17
"Jody Like a Melody" - 3:03
"Longhaired Redneck" - 3:22
"If That Ain't Country" - 4:49
"Willie, Waylon and Me" - 3:13
"Take This Job and Shove It" - 2:54
"Just to Prove My Love for You" - 2:23
"Jack Daniel's if You Please" - 3:16
"Would You Lay With Me (in a Field of Stone) - 2:49
"Divers Do It Deeper" - 3:01
"X's and O's (Kisses and Hugs)" - 3:45
"This Bottle (in My Hand)" - 2:49
"Get a Little Dirt On Your Hands" - 3:39
"Stand by Your Man" - 3:27
"Tennessee Whiskey" - 2:59
"Now I Lay Me Down to Cheat" - 3:22
"What Made You Change Your Mind" - 2:49
"The Ride" - 3:06
"Mona Lisa Lost Her Smile" - 3:39

Chart performance

David Allan Coe compilation albums
1984 compilation albums
Albums produced by Billy Sherrill
Columbia Records compilation albums